Snotties may refer to:
 Snottites: a colony of single-celled organisms resembling soft stalactites, found in caves
 A Royal Navy slang term for Midshipmen
Snotties (TV series), a 2006 New Zealand reality television program